Anna Margaret Ross (née McKittrick; 8 December 1860 – 2 February 1939), known by her pen-name Amanda McKittrick Ros, was an Irish writer. She published her first novel Irene Iddesleigh at her own expense in 1897. She wrote poetry and a number of novels. Her works were not read widely, and her eccentric, over-written, "purple" circumlocutory writing is alleged by some critics to be some of the worst prose and poetry ever written.

Life
McKittrick was born in Drumaness, County Down, on 8 December 1860, the fourth child of Eliza Black and Edward Amlave McKittrick, Principal of Drumaness High School. She was christened Anna Margaret at Third Ballynahinch Presbyterian Church on 27 January 1861. In the 1880s she attended Marlborough Teacher Training College in Dublin, was appointed Monitor at Millbrook National School, Larne, County Antrim, finished her training at Marlborough and then became a qualified teacher at the same school.

During her first visit to Larne she met Andrew Ross, a widower of 35, who was station master there. She married him at Joymount Presbyterian Church, Carrickfergus, County Antrim, on 30 August 1887.

Her husband financed the publication of Irene Iddesleigh as a gift to Ros on their tenth wedding anniversary, thus launching her literary career. She went on to write three novels and dozens of poems. In 1917 Andrew Ross died, and in 1922 Ros married Thomas Rodgers (1857/58–1933), a County Down farmer.

Ros died at the Royal Victoria Hospital in Belfast on 2 February 1939, under the name "Hannah Margaret Rodgers".

Writing
She wrote under the pen-name Amanda McKittrick Ros, possibly in an attempt to suggest a connection to the noble de Ros family of County Down. Ros was strongly influenced by the novelist Marie Corelli. She wrote: "My chief object of writing is and always has been, to write if possible in a strain all my own. This I find is why my writings are so much sought after." She imagined "the million and one who thirst for aught that drops from my pen", and predicted that she would "be talked about at the end of a thousand years."

Her "admirers" included Aldous Huxley, Siegfried Sassoon, C. S. Lewis and Mark Twain. Her novel Irene Iddesleigh was published in 1897. Twain considered Irene "one of the greatest unintentionally humorous novels of all time". A reader sent a copy of Irene to humorist Barry Pain, who in an 1898 review called it "a thing that happens once in a million years", and sarcastically termed it "the book of the century". He reported that he was initially entertained, but soon "shrank before it in tears and terror". Ros retorted in her preface to Delina Delaney by branding Pain a "clay crab of corruption", suggesting that he was so hostile only because he was secretly in love with her. But Ros claimed to have made enough money from her second novel, Delina Delaney, to build a house, which she named Iddesleigh.

In Ros' last novel, Helen Huddleson, all the characters are named after various fruits: Lord Raspberry, Cherry Raspberry, Sir Peter Plum, Christopher Currant, the Earl of Grape, Madame Pear. Of Pear, Ros wrote: "she had a swell staff of sweet-faced helpers swathed in stratagem, whose members and garments glowed with the lust of the loose, sparkled with the tears of the tortured, shone with the sunlight of bribery, dangled with the diamonds of distrust, slashed with sapphires of scandals..."

Ros believed that her critics lacked sufficient intellect to appreciate her talent, and was convinced that they conspired against her for revealing the corruption of society's ruling classes, thereby disturbing "the bowels of millions".

Legacy
Belfast Public Libraries have a large collection of manuscripts, typescripts and first editions of her work. Manuscript copies include Irene Iddesleigh, Sir Benjamin Bunn and Six Months in Hell. Typescript versions of all the above are held together with Rector Rose, St. Scandal Bags and The Murdered Heiress among others. The collection of first editions covers all her major works including volumes of her poetry, Fumes of Formation and Poems of Puncture, together with lesser known pieces such as Kaiser Bill and Donald Dudley: The Bastard Critic. The collection includes hundreds of letters addressed to Ros, many with her own comments in the margins. Also included are typed copies of her letters to newspapers, correspondence with her admiring publisher T. S. Mercer, an album of newspaper cuttings and photographs, and a script for a BBC broadcast from July 1943.

A few enthusiasts have kept her legend alive. A biography, O Rare Amanda!, was published in 1954; a collection of her most memorable passages was published in 1988 under the title Thine in Storm and Calm. In 2007 her life and works were fêted at a Belfast literary festival.

Denis Johnston, the Irish playwright, wrote a radio play entitled Amanda McKittrick Ros which was broadcast on BBC Home Service radio on 27 July 1943 and subsequently. The play is published in The Dramatic Works of Denis Johnston vol. 3. Johnston acquired a collection of papers from Ros including the unfinished typescript of Helen Huddleson. These can now be seen as part of the Denis Johnston collection in the library of the Ulster University at Coleraine, Northern Ireland.

Reputation
Nick Page, author of In Search of the World's Worst Writers, rated Ros the worst of the worst. He says that "[F]or Amanda, eyes are 'piercing orbs', legs are 'bony supports', people do not blush, they are 'touched by the hot hand of bewilderment'". Jack Loudan said that "Amanda is the most perfect instrument for measuring the sense of humour. Alert and quick witted people accept her at once: those she leaves entirely unmoved are invariably dull and unimaginative".

The Oxford Companion to Irish Literature described her as "uniquely dreadful".

Novels
Aldous Huxley compared her work to the Euphuist movement in Elizabethan literature:

Her novel Delina Delaney begins:

The Oxford literary group the Inklings, which included C. S. Lewis and J. R. R. Tolkien, held competitions to see who could read Ros' work aloud for the longest time without laughing.

Northrop Frye said of Ros' novels that they use "rhetorical material without being able to absorb or assimilate it: the result is pathological, a kind of literary diabetes".

Poetry
A poet as well as a novelist, Ros wrote Poems of Puncture and Fumes of Formation. The latter contains "Visiting Westminster Abbey", which opens:

Availability
, only Irene Iddesleigh is available in a modern edition. This contains appendices with Barry Pain's influential "Review" of the first edition and Thomas Beer's "introduction" to the 1926 edition along with Amanda's own venomous reactions. Her other books are rare and first editions command prices of US$300–800 on the used-book market. Belfast Central Library has an archive of her papers, and Queen's University of Belfast has some volumes by Ros in the stacks.

The Frank Ferguson-edited collection Ulster-Scots Writing: An Anthology (Four Courts, 2008) includes her poem "The Town of Tare".

On 11 November 2006 as part of a 50-year celebration, librarian Elspeth Legg hosted a major retrospective of her works, culminating in a public reading by 65 delegates of the entire contents of Fumes of Formation. The theme of the workshop that followed was 'Suppose you chance to write a book', Line 17 of 'Myself' from page 2 of Fumes of Formation.

Bibliography
 Irene Iddesleigh (novel, 1897)
 Delina Delaney (novel, 1898)
 Poems of Puncture (poetry, 1912)
 Kaiser Bill (broadsheet, 1915)
 A Little Belgian Orphan (broadsheet, 1916)
 Fumes of Formation (poetry, 1933)
 Bayonets of Bastard Sheen (poetry, 1949)
 St. Scandalbags (poetry, 1954)
 Donald Dudley: Tha Bastard Critic (poetry, 1954)
 Helen Huddleson (posthumous novel, 1969)
 O Rare Amanda!: The Life of Amanda McKittrick Ros Jack Loudan (London: Chatto & Windus 1954)
 Thine in Storm and Calm — An Amanda McKittrick Ros Reader, edited by Frank Ormsby (The Blackstaff Press, 1988.)
 The Dramatic Works of Denis Johnston vol. 3 (Gerrards Cross: Colin Smythe, 1992.)

See also

 List of Northern Irish writers
 Robert Coates
 The Eye of Argon
 Edward Bulwer-Lytton
 William McGonagall
 James McIntyre
 Julia A. Moore
 List of the Lost
 My Immortal

Notes

External links
 
 
 
 The Rocks of Regard—A brief guide to the life of Amanda McKittrick Ros
 Author information from EIRData
 Euphues Redivivus, Aldous Huxley's essay on Ros

1860 births
1939 deaths
19th-century Irish novelists
20th-century Irish poets
19th-century Irish women writers
20th-century Irish women writers
Irish women novelists
People from County Down
Irish women poets
Accidental deaths from falls
Accidental deaths in Northern Ireland